Abolhassan E'tesami (1903–1978), was an Iranian architect, calligrapher, painter, and novelist.

Biography 
His father Mīrzā Ebrāhīm Khan Mostawfī Eʿteṣām-al-Molk (or Ebrahim E'tesami) was from Ashtian and the head of finance of the Iranian province of Azerbaijan. His brother Yussef E'tesami was the founder of the Bahar journal, and the father of the poet Parvin E'tesami.

Abolhassan E'tesami was educated in Tehran at the Aghdasieh School, the American School, and the Kamal-ol-molk School of Fine Arts. Then he spent some years in Isfahan to learn architecture and decoration techniques, and later went to work at Tehran University.

E'tesami produced a series of architecture projects, detailed maquettes of which were made by himself. On the Iranian Ministry of Fine Arts' request, the maquettes were sent to Brussels' 1958 Universal Exhibition, where Abolhassan E'tesami was awarded the gold medal in the individual presentation category. The maquettes were later bought by the National Museum of Iran, and included in the permanent collection of the Islamic arts division.

In addition to architecture projects, E'tesami left a series of oil on canvas paintings including Some ruins in Dowlat-Abad, A village home in Niavaran, and Pasteur's intercession for Napoleon, and some novels including The left alone man and The malicious Mohil-o-doleh.

Gallery

References

Further reading 

Dehkhoda, Ali-Akbar. 1977. Biographical note. In Poems of Parvin Etessami, ed. Abolfath Etessami, p. 342. Tehran: Abolfath Etessami.
E'tesami, Abolhassan. 1958. Biographical note. Tehran University News Bulletin 374, pp. 34–7.

Iranian architects
Iranian calligraphers
Iranian male novelists
Iranian novelists
1903 births
1978 deaths
20th-century novelists
20th-century Iranian painters
20th-century Iranian architects